|}

The Henry II Stakes is a Group 3 flat horse race in Great Britain open to horses aged four years or older. It is run at Sandown Park over a distance of 2 miles and 50 yards, and it is scheduled to take place each year in late May.

History
The event is named after Henry II, who founded a priory on the site of Sandown Park in the 12th century. It was established in 1963, and the inaugural running was won by Gaul.

The present system of race grading was introduced in 1971, and for a period the Henry II Stakes held Group 3 status. It was promoted to Group 2 in 2002, and relegated back to Group 3 in 2012.

The leading horses from the Henry II Stakes often go on to compete in the following month's Gold Cup at Ascot. The last to win both in the same year was Big Orange in 2017.

Records

Most successful horse (3 wins):
 Persian Punch – 1997, 1998, 2000

Leading jockey (6 wins):
 Frankie Dettori – Drum Taps (1992), Mr Dinos (2003), Papineau (2004), Finalmente (2008), Opinion Poll (2012), Big Orange (2017)

Leading trainer (6 wins):
 Dick Hern – Grey of Falloden (1965), Charlton (1971), Zab (1975), Sea Anchor (1976), Smuggler (1978), Longboat (1986)

Winners since 1978

 .

Earlier winners

 1963: Gaul
 1964: Fighting Ship
 1965: Grey of Falloden
 1966: Fighting Charlie
 1967: Parbury
 1968: Chicago
 1969: Chicago
 1970: Ginger Boy
 1971: Charlton
 1972: Hornet
 1973: The Admiral
 1974: Ragstone
 1975: Zab
 1976: Sea Anchor
 1977: Grey Baron

See also
 Horse racing in Great Britain
 List of British flat horse races

References

 Paris-Turf:
 Racing Post:

 galopp-sieger.de – Henry II Stakes.
 ifhaonline.org – International Federation of Horseracing Authorities – Henry II Stakes (2019).
 pedigreequery.com – Henry II Stakes – Sandown Park.
 

Flat races in Great Britain
Sandown Park Racecourse
Open long distance horse races
Recurring sporting events established in 1963
1963 establishments in England